Forkhead box protein F1 (FOXF1) is a protein that in humans is encoded by the FOXF1 gene.

Function 

This gene belongs to the forkhead family of transcription factors which is characterized by a distinct forkhead domain.  FOX1 protein is important in the development of the pulmonary mesenchyme and the development of the gastrointestinal tract.

References

Further reading

External links 
 

Forkhead transcription factors